{{DISPLAYTITLE:C4H7Cl}}
The molecular formula C4H7Cl (molar mass: 90.55 g/mol, exact mass: 90.0236 u) may refer to:

 Crotyl chloride
 Methallyl chloride

Molecular formulas